Palaeontology is one of the two scientific journals of the Palaeontological Association (the other being Papers in Palaeontology). It was established in 1957 and is published on behalf of the Association by Wiley-Blackwell. The editor-in-chief is Barry Lomax (University of Nottingham). Palaeontology publishes articles on a range of palaeontological topics, including taphonomy, functional morphology, systematics, palaeo-environmental reconstruction and biostratigraphy. According to the Journal Citation Reports, the journal has a 2017 impact factor of 3.730, ranking it 1st out of 55 journals in the category "Paleontology".

References

External links 
 

Paleontology journals
Publications established in 1957
English-language journals
Wiley-Blackwell academic journals
Bimonthly journals